is a Japanese voice actress from Fukuoka who is affiliated with Aoni Production.

Roles

Anime
2013
Chibi Maruko-chan as Sister in high school
Tamako Market as Midori Tokiwa
Fantasista Doll as Tekoreishon <US>
One Piece as child
2014
One Piece as Assistant # 638, fairy, mom, child, woman
Tamako Love Story as Midori Tokiwa
2015The Idolmaster Cinderella Girls as Aiko TakamoriThe Idolmaster Cinderella Girls 2nd Season as Aiko Takamori
2017A Silent Voice as Naoka Ueno
2018Harukana Receive as Kanata's mother
2019One Piece as Charlotte Allmeg
2021One Piece as Tenjo-SagariYashahime: Princess Half-Demon as Oharu

Games
2010Tokimeki Memorial Girl's Side 3rd Story2012Ryū ga Gotoku 5: Yume Kanaeshi Mono as Riku
2013The Idolmaster Cinderella Girls as Aiko Takamori
2015God Eater Resurrection as Annette Koenig

RadioGachi Yomi! Deko Yomi!?Web Drama
2011Hōkago wa Mystery to Tomo ni'' as Ryō Kirigamine (voice)

References

External links
Aoni Production profile
Official blog

Japanese voice actresses
Living people
Voice actresses from Fukuoka Prefecture
1987 births
Aoni Production voice actors